Konstantin Negodyayev (born December 1, 1967 in Temirtau) is a Kazakhstani sprint canoer who competed from the mid-1990s to the early 2000s (decade). Competing in two Summer Olympics, he earned his best finish of seventh twice (1996: C-1 500 m, 2000: C-1 500 m).

External links
 Sports-Reference.com profile

1967 births
Canoeists at the 1996 Summer Olympics
Canoeists at the 2000 Summer Olympics
Kazakhstani male canoeists
Living people
People from Temirtau
Olympic canoeists of Kazakhstan
Asian Games medalists in canoeing
Canoeists at the 1994 Asian Games
Canoeists at the 1998 Asian Games
Medalists at the 1994 Asian Games
Medalists at the 1998 Asian Games
Asian Games gold medalists for Kazakhstan
20th-century Kazakhstani people